Ttaemiri (Korean: 때밀이) are the working staff who provide many services at the Jjimjilbang in South Korea.

In popular culture
God of Bath, a South Korean manhwa has a main character, Heo-se, who is a ttaemiri.

References

South Korean popular culture
Public baths